Eric L. Smidt (born 1960) is an American businessman. He is chairman and CEO of Harbor Freight Tools, which operates over 1,300 retail hardware stores in 48 states and generated revenue of approximately $6.5 billion according to an August 2021 Los Angeles Business Journal report.

Early life
Smidt was born in Los Angeles, California, in 1960 to Allan Smidt and Dorthy Smidt. His mother had multiple sclerosis and his father, overwhelmed, sent him to an orphanage when he was nine. Four years later, he went to live with an aunt in Tennessee, returning home after two years, before moving into his own apartment on his 16th birthday. He graduated from Grant High School in Van Nuys, a public school in Los Angeles.

In 1977, as a teenager, Smidt started Harbor Freight Tools with his father in a small building in North Hollywood, California. Originally known as Harbor Freight & Salvage Co., the company began as a mail-order tool business. Eric introduced the company's defining innovation, which was cutting out the middleman, and began to send tools directly from the factories to the customer.

Tenure as Chairman and CEO
In 1985, Smidt was named president at age 25; he served under that title until 1999, when he became CEO. In 2001, Smidt was listed as one of Ernst & Young's Entrepreneurs of the year.

In 2008, Eric responded to the turbulence in the global economy by implementing a company-wide reinvigoration plan. The program led to new products and lower prices.

Philanthropy
Smidt is the founder and president of The Smidt Foundation. With assets of approximately $200 million, the foundation's signature program, Harbor Freight Tools for Schools, supports skilled trades education in U.S. public high schools.

A long-time supporter of Los Angeles-area charitable organizations, Smidt in 2012 funded a new public high school in Los Angeles known as "Smidt Tech" (also known as Alliance Susan & Eric Smidt Technology High) for Alliance College-Ready Public Schools (an independent non-profit charter school manager).

In January 2013, Smidt directed Harbor Freight Tools to donate $1.4 million in tools and equipment to the Los Angeles Unified School District's (LAUSD) Career Technical Education program after learning that its annual budget was cut to one-quarter of what it was two years earlier. He named this program "Tools for Schools." He observed that "for far too long vocational education has not been given the attention and funding it deserves," and added that, "at a time when a well-trained workforce is essential to compete in the global economy, the United States too often falls short."

In August 2013, Smidt expanded the Tools for Schools program by donating a $100,000 gift of tools and equipment to vocational schools in and around Dillon County, South Carolina. Harbor Freight Tools for Schools awards more than $1 million to skilled trades teachers and their schools annually.

Marking the opening of the 500th Harbor Freight Tools store near Chicago, Smidt announced the contribution of $100,000 and the donation of tools to Chicago Public Schools to support teachers and students in skilled trades learning and internships.

In 2015, Harbor Freight Tools established a program to fund requests from non-profit organizations in the U.S. to support veterans, police and fire departments, and public education causes.

In 2016, the National Coalition for Homeless Veterans honored Harbor Freight Tools with its Outstanding Corporate Partner Award in recognition of the company's support for homeless veterans.

Under Smidt's leadership, Harbor Freight Tools has supported excellence in Career Technical Education to benefit teachers and students, providing donations to vocational classrooms via Donors Choose, to the Urban Assembly School for Green Careers in New York City, and Domus Academy's Work and Learn Program in Stamford, Connecticut. Additionally, new auto lifts were purchased for CEC Middle College in Denver, Colorado.

To help fund disaster relief efforts across the country, Smidt, on behalf of Harbor Freight Tools, made a $250,000 donation to the American Red Cross.

Smidt reportedly contributed $350,000 to support Mayor Eric Garcetti's effort to help Los Angeles secure the 2024 Olympic Games.

On February 14, 2018, The Smidt Foundation made a $50 million gift to Cedars-Sinai Medical Center to establish the Smidt Heart Institute. This gift, the largest single donation then received by Cedars-Sinai, was earmarked to fund cardiovascular disease and cardiology research efforts. "It's important to support outstanding local institutions, and we want to help amplify Cedars-Sinai's impact on human health and wellbeing here and far beyond Los Angeles. We are humbled to play a role in their long tradition of savings lives and serving our community," said Eric Smidt in a press release.

On March 22, 2020, Eric Smidt directed Harbor Freight to donate its entire supply of N95 masks, Face shields, and 5/7 mil Nitrile gloves to hospitals with a 24-hour emergency room.

In June 2022, Eric & Susan Smidt donated $5 million to the Holocaust Museum LA, which will allow the museum to double its campus in Pan Pacific Park.

Personal life
Smidt is a collector of modern art and serves on the board of the Los Angeles County Museum of Art.

Smidt is a prominent Los Angeles Democrat who has hosted fundraiser dinners for both Bill and Hillary Clinton.  He is a friend of former Mayor of Los Angeles Antonio Villaraigosa, and he helped pay down the Mayor's ethics fines. On March 4, 2013, LA Weekly reported that Smidt donated $50,000 to the Coalition for School Reform to elect Kate Anderson and Antonio Sanchez to the LAUSD Board of Education and to re-elect incumbent Monica Garcia. He contributed $114,300 to Democratic campaigns in 2012.

In 2010, Smidt was sued by his parents for "looting" Harbor Freight Tools. In 2022, Smidt purchased a $350-million megayacht.

References

1960 births
Living people
American aviators
American philanthropists
American retail chief executives
California Democrats
Grant High School (Los Angeles) alumni